Ashdon Halt was a railway station on the Saffron Walden Railway. It opened 14 August 1911 and closed 7 September 1964.

History

After many campaigns by villagers  Ashdon Halt was finally opened by the Great Eastern Railway, it became part of the London and North Eastern Railway during the Grouping of 1923. Passing on to the Eastern Region of British Railways on nationalisation in 1948, it was then closed by the British Railways Board.

Sources

References

External links
 Ashdon Halt station on navigable 1946 O. S. map

Disused railway stations in Essex
Former Great Eastern Railway stations
Railway stations in Great Britain opened in 1911
Railway stations in Great Britain closed in 1964
Beeching closures in England
1911 establishments in England